Several organisations and government acts designate species of special concern.  Among them are:

 California species of special concern
 The Canadian Species at Risk Act

See also
Species of concern